{{DISPLAYTITLE:CO2 rocket}}
A carbon dioxide rocket (CO2 rocket) is a type of rocket that uses carbon dioxide as a propellant. It should be fired outdoors.

Carbon dioxide rocket (slurry, hybrid, etc.) can be used in model rocketry, where it is also known as a pop rocket. Its engine could generate a specific impulse of around 280 seconds.

See also
Water rocket

References 

Model rocketry
Model rockets